A number of different units of measurement have been used in Ethiopia. The values of most of these units are not well defined.  In 1963, Ethiopia adopted the metric system.

Pre-metric era 

These units have also been referred to as Abyssinian units of measurements.

Length 

Different units were used to measure length. Values provided below are approximations only as these units were often not well-defined.

1 pic = 0.686 metres

1 farsang = 5070 m

1 berri =  farsang (approx. 3 pics)

Mass 

A number of units were used to measure mass.  One rotto is approximately equal to 0.311 kilograms. Some other units are provided below.

1 drachm =  rotto

1  =  rotto

1  (ounce) =  rotto

1 mocha =  rotto

Capacity 

Two types of measuring system were used, one for dry measures and one for liquid measures.

Dry 

Different units were used to measure dry capacities.  One  is approximately equal to 0.44 litres.

1 ardeb = 10 or 24  (these may sometimes be referred to as either the long ardeb, equal to 24  or the short ardeb, equal to 10 )

Liquids 

The kuba(kubaya)pronounced in Ethiopia is approximately equal to 1.016 litres.

Household units 

More than 70 different units are used in an ordinary household.  Some of the more important units used are kilograms, kunna, medeb, esir, bobo, pieces, litres, tassa, sini, bottles, guchiye, sahen and weket.

Details for some of the common units of measurements are given below:

Medeb: meaning "heap", can be large or small, and is mainly used for vegetables.
Tassa: A large serving can (often for cereals, pulses and liquids).
Sini: A small ceramic cup often used for coffee, pulses (e.g. oilseeds) and spices.
Birchiko: A glass often for pulses and liquids
Kubaya: A mug, often for cereals, pulses and liquids.
Esir: A "bundle" often used for cabbage and chat (a mild stimulant)
Tikil: A wrap often for sugar and coffee.

(Note: Most of the above are actual household items, such as tassa translating to can, and sini mainly being used for serving coffee, not measuring coffee or any other substances.)

References

Further reading
 
 
 

Ethiopian culture
Ethiopia